is a 1977 Japanese anime film directed by Toshio Masuda and Noboru Ishiguro. The film consists of various television episodes edited from the "Iscandar" arc of the 1974 Space Battleship Yamato television series. It originally had a new ending created for the theatrical release. In English-speaking countries, it was known by the title Space Cruiser.

Plot 
In the distant future, the war between the human race and the aliens known as the Gamilons has destroyed the Earth. Radioactive asteroids have devastated the planet making its atmosphere uninhabitable. In an effort to assist the Earth, Queen Starsha of the planet Iscandar offers the Earth Forces a device that can completely neutralize the radiation.

In order to get this device, the space battleship Yamato is launched from the remains of its World War II ancestor on a 148,000 light-year journey. The crew of the Space Battleship Yamato has only one Earth year to travel to Iscandar and back, or the human race will become extinct.

It originally had a new ending created for the theatrical release in which Starsha had died before the Yamato reaching Iscandar.

Cast

Production
In turn, its production budget record was broken two years later by Hayao Miyazaki's Lupin III film Castle of Cagliostro (1979).

Box office

Reception
In contemporary reviews, Variety declared the film as "with a few exceptions, strictly Saturday morning tv fare" that "should bore adults silly and, owing to jargon saturated dialog, confuse the six-to-12-year-old audience that might have appreciated it." The review commented on the animation, describing it as "flat, static, often poorly- synched and divided into segments for easy commercial insertion." The Monthly Film Bulletin stated that despite being "executed with considerable flair for piling disaster on ever more improbable disaster [the film] is mainly of interest as a cartoon that succeeds in capitalising on both Jaws and Star Wars, as well as conjuring memories of both Japanese glory and defeat in the Second War." The review concluded that the film "is so perfunctorily cobbled together and, on the whole, so indifferently animated [...] that expectations are almost immediately dashed."

Notes

References

Bibliography

External links 
 
 
 
 Review of the English Language 'Space Cruiser Yamato' movie

1977 anime films
Adventure anime and manga
Animated films based on animated series
Compilation films
Films set in the 22nd century
Japanese animated science fiction films
1970s Japanese-language films
1970s science fiction action films
Space Battleship Yamato films